Tony Vairelles (born 10 April 1973) is a French former professional footballer who played as a forward.

Club career
A much-travelled centre-forward, the talented Vairelles started his professional career with hometown club AS Nancy before moving to RC Lens in summer 1995. After four seasons with considerable success (one league and one cup title) he joined Olympique Lyonnais who sent him out on loan three times and finally sold him to Stade Rennais. From then he changed clubs every season. Before the 2008 Major League Soccer season he had a trial with Toronto FC but did not fit into their plans and was not signed. In 2009, he joined FC Gueugnon after a stint at F91 Dudelange. He also became the club's main investor.

International career
Vairelles represented France at the 1996 Summer Olympics.

He made his senior debut for France in an August 1998 friendly match against Austria and went on to earn eight caps, scoring one goal. He played his final international game in April 2000 against Slovenia.

Personal life
Vairelles is the first player from the Gypsy community (through his maternal biological grandfather) to play for the France national team.

He has one sister, Marilyn, and five brothers, Giovan, Diego, Jimmy, Gino, and Fabrice. His cousin David Vairelles and his younger brothers Giovan and Diego are all professional footballers.

Tony Vairelles and his brothers Giovan, Jimmy, and Fabrice were held in pre-trial detention in Nancy from 25 October 2011 after a shooting in a discothèque in Essey-lès-Nancy. He was freed on 27 March 2012 and put on probation. In June 2015, the trial was still ongoing with Tony Vairelles and his brothers being charged with attempted murder.

On 16 May 2022, Vairelles was sentenced to three years in prison for his part in the attack.

Career statistics
Score and result list France's goal tally first, score column indicates score after Vairelles goal.

Honours
Lens
Ligue 1: 1997–98
Coupe de la Ligue: 1999

Lyon
 Trophée des Champions: 2002
 Ligue 1: 2002–03

Dudelange
 BGL Ligue: 2008–09
 Luxembourg Cup: 2008–09

External links
 
 
 Career stats - France Football
 
 Profile, stats and pictures of Tony Vairelles

References

1973 births
Living people
Romani footballers
French Romani people
French footballers
Association football forwards
France international footballers
France under-21 international footballers
Footballers at the 1996 Summer Olympics
Olympic footballers of France
Competitors at the 1993 Mediterranean Games
Mediterranean Games bronze medalists for France
Mediterranean Games medalists in football
AS Nancy Lorraine players
RC Lens players
Olympique Lyonnais players
FC Girondins de Bordeaux players
SC Bastia players
Stade Rennais F.C. players
Lierse S.K. players
Tours FC players
CA Bastia players
F91 Dudelange players
FC Gueugnon players
Ligue 1 players
Ligue 2 players
Championnat National players
Championnat National 2 players
Belgian Pro League players
French expatriate footballers
French expatriate sportspeople in Belgium
Expatriate footballers in Belgium
French expatriate sportspeople in Luxembourg
Expatriate footballers in Luxembourg
Sportspeople from Nancy, France
Footballers from Grand Est